The 1987–88 season was the 85th season in Bradford City A.F.C.'s history, and their 73rd in The Football League. They finished fourth in the Football League Second Division, having been six points clear at the top of the table at one point. City went into the play-offs and lost over two legs to a Middlesbrough side who City had beaten twice during the league campaign. Having won the first leg 2–1, Middlesbrough went ahead in the second game and after extra time finished 2–0 winners.

The club also reached the fifth round of the FA Cup, the quarter-finals of the League Cup, where they were defeated by eventual winners Luton Town and the semi-finals of the Simod Cup, where they were also knocked by the eventual winners, Reading.

Captain Stuart McCall and forward John Hendrie left at the end of the season. McCall went to an Everton side managed by Colin Harvey and Hendrie to Newcastle United.

Match results
Source

Legend

Football League Division Two

Play-offs

FA Cup

League Cup

Full Members Cup

Source

Player details
Sources

See also
1987–88 in English football

References

Bradford City A.F.C. seasons
Bradford City